Seaton Burn is a village in Tyne and Wear, England to the north of Newcastle upon Tyne, and adjacent to Wideopen which is just south of it. The A1 used to pass through the village but now bypasses the village just to the west, where it meets the A19 which is the link road to the Tyne Tunnel.

Economy 
Seaton Burn Colliery opened in 1844. By October 1852 the colliery was owned by John Bowes & Co. Employment rose to 1,311 in 1921, and steadily fell after that until it was closed by the National Coal Board on 17 August 1965.  NCB Brenkley Colliery was based on the old Seaton Burn Colliery site and continued producing coal until 1986. Some of the old Seaton Burn/Brenkley Colliery buildings have been adapted into the modern buildings built on the old site. Remaining walls of the "Fitting Shop" and "Blacksmiths Shop" can be observed. These have been combined into the modern buildings that are now there.
Little now remains of the mine except for the old Seaton Burn Wagonway leading southeast from the village. This linked with the line from the mine at Weetslade and then went east to link with both the East Coast Main Line and the line leading south to Percy Main.  The old track bed has now been established as a cycleway and leads to a quite extensive cycle network in North Tyneside.

Landmarks 
Seaton Burn is a stream that flows through southeastern Northumberland and reaches the North Sea at Seaton Sluice, after running through Holywell Dene.

Notable people 
Jack Carr (1876–1948), professional footballer with Newcastle United, born in Seaton Burn
Robson Green, English actor, educated at North Gosforth Academy, previously called Seaton Burn College

References

External links

Seaton Burn Cricket Club
Seaton Burn Football Club

Villages in Tyne and Wear
Metropolitan Borough of North Tyneside